Thomas College is a private college in Waterville, Maine. It offers undergraduate and graduate degrees and is accredited by the New England Commission of Higher Education. As of Fall 2019 Thomas College currently enrolled 1,949 students; 1,819 were undergraduate students and 130 were graduate students.

History
Keist Business College was established in 1894 when it was founded as a nonsectarian, co-educational college dedicated to career training. It was located on three floors above the F. W. Woolworth Company in the Edith Building on Main Street in Waterville. At the turn of the century, Keist Business College was purchased by William Morgan. It was renamed Morgan Business College in 1896.

In 1911, a Peterborough, New Hampshire railroad administrator, John L. Thomas Sr., who himself was a business college graduate, purchased the college and renamed it Morgan-Thomas Business College. For half a century the college trained accountants and secretaries.

In 1950, the college was renamed Thomas Junior College and in 1956, the college moved from Main Street to the former home of John Ware on Silver Street.

The 1960s was a decade of significant growth and development for Thomas College. Men's and women's dormitories were dedicated. Thomas Junior College was renamed Thomas College. In 1963, the Maine State Legislature granted Thomas the right to confer four-year degrees and in 1964 the Mariner Library, named after Chairman of the Thomas College Board of Trustees, Ernest C. Mariner, was opened. In 1965, a theater for lectures and dramatic presentations was constructed, but towards the end of the decade, the college had outgrown its Silver Street campus.

The entire college was relocated to the West River Road campus.

In March 2011, the Harold Alfond Foundation announced a commitment of $5 million to support the construction of the Harold Alfond Academic Center and the establishment of the Harold and Bibby Alfond Scholarship Fund. This commitment was the largest single gift in the history of the college. The college also unveiled the campus master plan which outlines plans for campus growth with construction of a dozen new buildings.

In April 2012, the college announced the inauguration of its fifth president, Laurie G. Lachance, M.B.A.'92. Lachance is the first woman and first alumna to head the college.

Academics
Thomas College offers over 30 undergraduate majors including accounting, criminal justice, elementary education, sports management, psychology, business management, and information technology.

Campus
The Thomas College campus is located on 120 acres of woods and fields along the historic Kennebec River. Thomas is a highly residential campus with students living in ten residence halls.

Academic buildings consist of the Ayotte Center and the Harold Alfond Academic Center, which contains the Library. The Laurette Ayotte Auditorium also houses classrooms along with a 300-seat auditorium used for classes, meetings, lectures, and concerts. The Alumni House contains the office of institutional advancement as well as conference rooms.

Athletic facilities include the Harold Alfond Athletic Center, the Larry Mahaney Gymnasium, Alumni Field, two all-weather turf fields, and athletic fields for soccer, baseball, field hockey, and softball.

The George and Marty Spann Student Commons is the main student gathering center on campus and includes the dining center, campus bookstore, meeting rooms, and recreation rooms.

Campus housing options vary and include traditional style dormitories in Grant, Parks and Heath Halls, suite-style living in Bartlett Hall, motel-style options in "The Village" residence halls, apartment-style living in "The Townhouses," and pod-style living in Hinman Hall.

Athletics
Thomas has also started an Esports program, with it building an athletic facility by 2022 to assist with its growth.

The college mascot is a terrier nicknamed "Tommy" who appears at sporting and other public events.

The school has produced a number of international soccer players, including Mikkail Crockwell and Tre Ming, both of whom played for the Bermuda national football team.

References

External links
 Official website

 
Educational institutions established in 1894
Universities and colleges in Kennebec County, Maine
Private universities and colleges in Maine
1894 establishments in Maine